The April Constitution of Poland ( or Konstytucja kwietniowa) was the general law passed by the act of the Polish Sejm on 23 April 1935. It introduced in the Second Polish Republic a presidential system with certain elements of authoritarianism.

Summary
The act introduced the idea that the state is a common good of all the citizens. It also limited the powers of the Sejm and Senate while strengthening the authority of the President of Poland. The President was responsible for choosing the members of the government, which, in turn, was responsible to the parliament. He also had the right to dismiss the parliament before the end of term and named a third of the senators, the commander-in-chief of the Polish Army, and the General Inspector of the Armed Forces.Seidner, Stanley S. Marshal Edward Śmigły-Rydz Rydz and the Defense of Poland, New York, 1978.

He also had the right to issue decrees and veto acts passed by the Sejm non-constructively.

Among the most notable features of the new constitution was the president's right to name his successor in the case of war. That was used as the legal base for the existence of the Polish Government in Exile during and after World War II. The constitution was officially abolished on 22 July 1944 by the Polish Committee of National Liberation in their manifesto, which temporarily returned to the March Constitution prior to adopting the socialist constitution in 1952. The government-in-exile operated under the April Constitution until December 1990, when it transferred its authority to Lech Walesa after his election as Poland's first noncommunist president in 46 years.

See also
Electoral districts of Poland (1935–1939)

References
 
 Full text of April Constitution.  Uniwersytet im. Adama Mickiewicza w Poznaniu

External links 
 English translation of April Constitution.

1935 in law
1935 in Poland
Constitutions of Poland
Poland, 1935
Legal history of Poland
1935 documents